Giovânia Domingas Campos (born 31 October 1985), simply known as Giovânia, is a Brazilian footballer who plays as a forward for São Paulo FC. She has been a member of the Brazil women's national team.

International career
Giovânia played for Brazil at senior level in the 2014 Copa América Femenina.

International goals
Scores and results list Brazil's goal tally first

Honours

National team
 Copa América Femenina: 2014

References

1985 births
Living people
Women's association football forwards
Brazilian women's footballers
Sportspeople from Maranhão
Brazil women's international footballers
Saad Esporte Clube (women) players
Associação Atlética Francana players
Botucatu Futebol Clube players
Incheon Hyundai Steel Red Angels WFC players
Rio Preto Esporte Clube players
São José Esporte Clube (women) players
Mynavi Vegalta Sendai Ladies players
São Paulo FC players
Brazilian expatriate women's footballers
Brazilian expatriate sportspeople in South Korea
Expatriate women's footballers in South Korea
Brazilian expatriate sportspeople in Japan
Expatriate women's footballers in Japan